The 2021 Virginia Tech Hokies football team represented Virginia Tech during the 2021 NCAA Division I FBS football season. The Hokies were led by sixth-year head coach Justin Fuente, prior to his departure following the Duke game.  J. C. Price took over as the interim head coach for the final two games of the regular season and the bowl game.  They played their home games at Lane Stadium in Blacksburg, Virginia, competing as members of the Atlantic Coast Conference (ACC). The Hokies accepted a bid to the Pinstripe Bowl to face Maryland, where they lost 54–10.

Prior season 
In a season limited due to the ongoing COVID-19 pandemic, the Hokies finished the 2020 season 5–6, 5–5 to finish in a tie for seventh place in ACC play. On December 16, 2020, it was announced that the players had voted to end their season and would not consider a bid to a bowl game. The Hokies had appeared in a bowl game for 27 consecutive seasons, dating back to the 1993 Independence Bowl. This was fourth-longest streak of consecutive bowl game appearances in college football history.

Schedule

Source:

Coaching staff

Rankings

Game Summaries

vs. No. 10 North Carolina

vs Middle Tennessee

at West Virginia

vs No. 24 (FCS) Richmond

vs No. 14 Notre Dame

vs Pitt

vs Syracuse

at Georgia Tech

at Boston College

vs Duke

at Miami

at Virginia

Players drafted into the NFL

References

Virginia Tech
Virginia Tech Hokies football seasons
Virginia Tech Hokies football